The 2022 Singapore Premier League (also known as the AIA Singapore Premier League due to sponsorship reasons) was the 5th season of the Singapore Premier League, the top-flight Singaporean professional league for association football clubs, since its rebranding in 2018. The champions of the 2022 Singapore Premier League should have qualified for the AFC Champions League. The season began in March and ended on 15 October.

Lion City Sailors were the defending champions, having won their third Singapore Premier League title in the previous season. Albirex Niigata (S) won their fifth title.

Format
The following key changes were made to the rules since the 2022 season:  

 Each team is able to register up to 25 players in their squad, a reduction of 3 players as compared from 2020.
 Albirex is allowed to have a minimum squad of eighteen (18) Players under non-amateur (Professional) contract, as at the pre-season minimum registration deadline and a maximum of twenty-five (25) Players.
 From 2021, Albirex is allowed to sign a maximum of 2 overage Singaporean players.  As in 2019 and 2020, Albirex must have two Singaporeans in their starting lineup for each game.
 Young Lions is allowed to register a minimum of twenty (20) Players as at the pre-season minimum registration deadline and a maximum of thirty-five (35) Players as at the close of the first registration window.
 Young Lions and Lion City Sailors Football Club to play their home games at Jalan Besar Stadium while Balestier Khalsa will play at Toa Payoh Stadium.   Bishan Stadium is under renovation till end of season.  Other stadiums used are: (1) Our Tampines Hub (Tampines Rovers and Geylang International), Hougang Stadium (Hougang United) and (3) Jurong East Stadium (Albirex Niigata and Tanjong Pagar United).
 Clubs will be equipped with Global Positioning Systems (GPS) devices - among other performance and tracking gear. Value of the sponsorship is  worth around $620,000.
 SPL clubs are now allowed to register a maximum of four foreign players with no age restrictions, of whom at least one shall be of the nationality of an AFC Member Association (Asian). A maximum of four foreign players may be named or fielded in any one match.
 Players shall be allocated jersey numbers 1 to 50. Jersey number become available for allocation to new members after a player ceased to play for a club.

New rules for 2022.

 Clubs will be required to field only one U-23 player – instead of three – for the first half of a match from next season.
 There will be no limit on the number of U-23 players registered in each squad.
 All SPL teams will play each other four time. 
 Clubs will be able to register 20 players per match. There will be nine substitutes allowed on a team’s bench – up from seven – and  clubs will be permitted to make up to five substitutions per match.
 Each team will need to field a minimum of one Under-23 player of Singaporean nationality for the entire duration of the first half. This is a reduction from three in 2020.
 Youth elite leagues are slated to resume.
 New scheme to incentivise SPL clubs to place higher priority on their youth development programmes.
 Clubs will receive monetary rewards for each of their U-23 players who gets called up to the national teams. 
 1st transfer window:  1 Jan 2021 to 20 March 2022, 2nd transfer window: 17 May 2021 to 13 June 2022

On 30 September 2022, it was announced by AFC that they had agreed to give its consent for Brunei DPMM's participation in the 2023 Singapore Premier League and Singapore Cup.  This is subject to approval from FIFA.

Teams 
A total of 8 teams competed in the league. Albirex Niigata (S) from Japan is the only foreign team invited.

Stadiums and locations

Personnel and sponsors
Note: Flags indicate national team as has been defined under FIFA eligibility rules. Players may hold more than one non-FIFA nationality.

Coaching changes

Note 1: Marko Kraljević was subsequently appointed as the Head, Youth for Hougang United.

Transfers

Foreign players 
Singapore Premier League clubs can sign a maximum of four foreign players in the 2021 season, up from three as compared to 2019. However, one of them has to be 21 years old or younger on 1 January 2021 (Or at the age of registration).

Albirex Niigata can sign up unlimited number of Singaporean players for the new season. Only 2 local player above 23 years old is allowed.

Players name in bold indicates the player was registered after the season start or during the mid-season transfer window.

Note 1: From 2021, Albirex is allowed to sign a maximum of 2 Singaporean players above the age of 23.

Results

League table

Fixtures and results
Clubs play each other four times for 28 matches each.

Matches 1–14

Matches 15–28

Statistics

Top scorers
As of 21 Oct 2022

Hat-tricks 

Note
4 Player scored 4 goals
5 Player scored 5 goals

Top assists
As of 21 Oct 2022

Clean sheets
As of 1 Oct 2022

Penalty missed

Own goal

Yellow Cards (Team) 
As of 27 Oct 2022

Yellow Cards (Players) 
As of 27 Oct 2022

Red Cards (Team) 
As of 27 Oct 2022

Awards

Monthly awards

Singapore Premier League Awards night winners

References

External links
 Football Association of Singapore website
 Singapore Premier League website

2022
1
2022 in Asian association football leagues